Nangouna is a town in the Tansila Department of Banwa Province in western Burkina Faso.  it had a population of 1,483.

References

Populated places in the Boucle du Mouhoun Region
Banwa Province